Nélson Macedo Monte (born 30 July 1995) is a Portuguese professional footballer who plays for G.D. Chaves on loan from Ukrainian club SC Dnipro-1 as a right-back or a central defender.

Club career

Rio Ave
Born in Vila do Conde, Monte joined local Rio Ave FC's youth system in 2012, signing from S.L. Benfica to finish his development. On 30 January 2014, he and Silvério agreed to five-year professional contracts.

On 12 April 2014, while still a junior, Monte made his professional − and Primeira Liga − debut, playing the full 90 minutes in a 1−2 home loss against S.C. Olhanense. On 21 August the following year, he was sent off in a 1–0 win over S.C. Braga also at the Estádio dos Arcos.

Monte was in advanced negotiations with FC Porto in early February 2016, but the two clubs did not agree terms. In 2017–18, after the losses of Roderick Miranda and Marcelo to the back line, he played the majority of games for the first time; the following season ended for him in March due to surgery on his left ankle.

On 1 October 2020, Monte missed in a penalty shootout at home to A.C. Milan in the play-off round of the UEFA Europa League; his attempt would have won the game had it gone in, but the Italians won 9–8.

Monte cut ties with Rio Ave in September 2021, having totalled 139 appearances without scoring.

Dnipro
Shortly after leaving, Monte joined SC Dnipro-1 in the Ukrainian Premier League on a two-year deal. On 24 February 2022, after the Russian invasion of Ukraine, he was evacuated from the city of Dnipro; he drove into Romania and took a flight back to his home country.

On 7 March 2022, FIFA suspended the contracts of all foreign players and coaches affiliated with the Ukrainian Association of Football until 30 June, with the former being allowed to sign a contract with clubs in other countries until that date. Eight days later, Monte used that regulation to sign with UD Almería of the Spanish Segunda División until the end of the season. The Andalusian side won promotion as champions, though he was completely unused.

Monte returned to his country's top flight on 5 July 2022, signing for a year at newly promoted G.D. Chaves.

International career
Monte earned 13 caps for Portugal at under-19 level, starting with a 1–1 draw with Spain in Budapest on 10 October 2013. He played three under-20 matches in 2015, including a group finale victory over Colombia on their way to the quarter-finals of the FIFA World Cup in New Zealand.

References

External links

Portuguese League profile 

1995 births
Living people
People from Vila do Conde
Sportspeople from Porto District
Portuguese footballers
Association football defenders
Primeira Liga players
Rio Ave F.C. players
G.D. Chaves players
Ukrainian Premier League players
SC Dnipro-1 players
UD Almería players
Portugal youth international footballers
Portuguese expatriate footballers
Expatriate footballers in Ukraine
Expatriate footballers in Spain
Portuguese expatriate sportspeople in Ukraine
Portuguese expatriate sportspeople in Spain